The Mpwapwa worm lizard (Chirindia mpwapwaensis) is an amphisbaenian species in the family Amphisbaenidae. The species is endemic to Tanzania.

References

Chirindia
Reptiles described in 1932
Taxa named by Arthur Loveridge
Endemic fauna of Tanzania
Reptiles of Tanzania